The 2018 Zimbabwe Tri-Nation Series was a cricket tournament held from 1 to 8 July 2018 in Zimbabwe. It was a tri-nation series between Australia, Pakistan and Zimbabwe, with all the matches played as Twenty20 Internationals (T20Is) at the Harare Sports Club. In the fourth T20I, Pakistan beat Zimbabwe by seven wickets, therefore Australia and Pakistan qualified for the final. Pakistan defeated Australia in the final by six wickets to win the series.

Originally, the tour was just going to feature Australia and Zimbabwe, with the two teams playing two Tests and three One Day Internationals (ODIs). In June 2018, the Zimbabwe team threatened to boycott the tour in a dispute over outstanding money that has not been paid to players. Zimbabwe Cricket (ZC) paid one of the three months' worth of outstanding salaries, with the players giving ZC the deadline of 25 June 2018 to pay the rest, or face a boycott. However, despite not being paid, the players are likely to call off the protest and play in the series, but the demand for the outstanding salaries payment deadline remains in place. Zimbabwe Cricket assured players that all the outstanding salaries would be paid by 25 July 2018, one month after the players' deadline. A few days later, Zimbabwe Cricket named a 22-man preliminary squad for the series, which was trimmed down to a final seventeen players. Zimbabwe did not initially name a captain, after Graeme Cremer was sacked following the 2018 Cricket World Cup Qualifier tournament. A day before the first match, Hamilton Masakadza was named as Zimbabwe's captain.

Squads

After the first T20I, Kyle Jarvis was ruled out for the series due to injury and was replaced by Donald Tiripano in Zimbabwe's squad.

Points table

T20I series

1st T20I

2nd T20I

3rd T20I

4th T20I

5th T20I

6th T20I

Final

References

External links
 Series home at ESPN Cricinfo

2018 in Australian cricket
2018 in Pakistani cricket
2018 in Zimbabwean cricket
International cricket competitions in 2018
Australian cricket tours of Zimbabwe
Pakistani cricket tours of Zimbabwe